Ugrasena is a character mentioned in the Hindu epic, Mahabharata. He is the King of Mathura, a kingdom that was established by the powerful fearless Abhira tribes from the Yaduvamsha clan. His son was Kamsa, and Krishna's maternal grandfather, Devaka, was his brother. King Ugrasena was overthrown by Kamsa, and was sentenced to life in prison, along with Kamsa's cousin, Devaki, and her husband, Vasudeva. Krishna reinstalled Ugrasena as the ruler of Mathura once more after defeating his wicked uncle.

Mythology 
According to the Puranas, Kamsa issued an order for the execution of his own father once he grew paranoid of the valour of Krishna and Balarama in Mathura, observing them slay wild elephants that he had released for their murder. He ordered his father to be thrown in the river Kalindi, bound hand and foot. This was among the many reasons that would lead to his nephew slaying him.

Krishna treated Ugrasena with honour upon his prestigious welcome and reception to the city of Mathura:

Samba, the son of Krishna and great-grand son of Ugrasena, had insulted several sages by disguising himself as a pregnant woman and asked the sages to ascertain the baby's gender. The sages cursed him to deliver an iron rod, which was to cause the annihilation of his entire clan. The Yadavas reported these tidings to Ugrasena, who had the rod turned into powder, and thrown into the sea. He also prohibited liquor in his kingdom. Sometime, after this incident he died and attained heaven. He, along with Bhurshiravas, Shalya, Uttara and his brother Shankha, Vasudeva, Bhuri, Kamsa, joined the company of devas in heaven.

Personality 
In contrast to his son Kamsa, Ugrasena is described to be a conscientious and capable ruler, and a great devotee of Vishnu. The Vishnu Purana states that the city of Mathura was "well presided over by Ugrasena, and abounded in a happy population both of men and women".

References 

People related to Krishna
Characters in the Mahabharata
Mythological kings